Władysław Giergiel (29 September 1917 – 17 October 1991) was a Polish footballer. He played in one match for the Poland national football team in 1947.

References

External links
 

1917 births
1991 deaths
Polish footballers
Poland international footballers
Place of birth missing
Association footballers not categorized by position